Cătălin Valentin Păun (born 3 January 1988) is a Romanian professional footballer.

Alloa Athletic
Alloa Athletic manager, Danny Lennon, signed Cătălin Păun after a successful trial period prior to the 2015–16 Scottish Championship season. Păun is employed at Stirling University and had been playing for Stirling University F.C. in the Scottish Lowland League.

References

External links

1988 births
Living people
FC Rapid București players
ACF Gloria Bistrița players
FC Petrolul Ploiești players
ASC Daco-Getica București players
Alloa Athletic F.C. players
CS Balotești players
Liga I players
Liga II players
Romanian footballers
Romanian expatriate footballers
Expatriate footballers in Scotland
Scottish Professional Football League players
Association football defenders